Richard MacGillivray Dawkins FBA (24 October 1871 – 4 May 1955) was a British archaeologist. He was associated with the British School at Athens, of which he was Director between 1906 and 1913.

Early life
He was the son of Rear-Admiral Richard Dawkins of Stoke Gabriel and his wife Mary Louisa McGillivray, only surviving daughter of Simon McGillivray. He was educated at Marlborough College and at King's College, London where he trained as an electrical engineer.

Academic career
He took part in the dig at Palékastro, and the survey of Lakonia (see Artemis Orthia and Menelaion, Sparta); also at Rhitsona. He undertook linguistic fieldwork in Cappadocia from 1909 to 1911, which resulted in a basic work on Cappadocian Greek. Then he led a dig at Filakopí from 1911.

He was a fellow of Emmanuel College, Cambridge. He was director of the British School at Athens from 1906 to 1913. During the First World War, he served as an intelligence officer attached to the Royal Navy in Crete. In December 1919, he was elected the first Bywater Professor of Byzantine and Modern Greek Language and Literature at the University of Oxford. Between 1928 and 1930 Dawkins served as president of the Folklore Society, and in his later life published three considerable collections of Greek folk tales.

In 1907, he inherited the Plas Dulas estate from a first cousin. There he experimented with plant importation and cultivation. He also displayed archaeological antiquities within the garden.

Works
Modern Greek in Asia Minor (1916)
The sanctuary of Artemis Orthia at Sparta (1929)
The Cypriot Chronicle of Makhairas (1932)
The Monks of Athos (1936)
Forty-five Stories from the Dodecanese (1950)
Arabian Nights
Norman Douglas (G. Orioli, 1933 [Lungarno series], revised 1952)
Modern Greek Folktales (1953)
More Greek Folktales (1955)
More stories from the Arabian Nights (1957)

References and sources
References

Sources
R. J. H. Jenkins, Richard MacGillivray Dawkins, 1871-1955, Proceedings of the British Academy, 41 (1955), 373–88.

External links

 

1871 births
1955 deaths
People educated at Marlborough College
Alumni of King's College London
British archaeologists
Directors of the British School at Athens
Fellows of the British Academy
Presidents of the Folklore Society
Travelers in Asia Minor